Allt-y-Main is a hamlet in the  community of Meifod, Powys, Wales, which is 86 miles (139 km) from Cardiff and 156 miles (252 km) from London.

References

See also
List of localities in Wales by population

Villages in Powys